Ceratrichia phocion,also known as the common forest sylph, is a species of butterfly in the family Hesperiidae. It is found in Guinea, Sierra Leone, Liberia, Ivory Coast, Ghana, Nigeria, Cameroon, Equatorial Guinea, Gabon and the Republic of the Congo. The habitat consists of forests.

Adults are attracted to flowers.

Subspecies
Ceratrichia phocion phocion (Guinea, Sierra Leone, Liberia, Ivory Coast, Ghana, Nigeria, western Cameroon)
Ceratrichia phocion camerona Miller, 1971 (Cameroon: except west, Equatorial Guinea, Gabon, Congo)

References

Butterflies described in 1781
Hesperiinae